Partial general elections were held in Luxembourg on 28 May 1922, electing 25 of the 48 seats in the Chamber of Deputies in the centre and north of the country. The Party of the Right won 13 of the 25 seats, but saw its total number of seats fall from 27 to 26.

Results

By constituency

References 

Chamber of Deputies (Luxembourg) elections
Legislative election, 1922
Luxembourg
1922 in Luxembourg
May 1922 events
Election and referendum articles with incomplete results